The Dr. von Hauner Children's Hospital or Dr. von Haunersches Kinderspital is the pediatric clinic and polyclinic of the LMU Klinikum in Munich, Germany.  It is located at the Campus Innenstadt (City Center).

The hospital combines general pediatric and pediatric surgery. The hospital has 180 beds in total, 119 pediatric beds with 61 additional beds for pediatric surgery. Both hospitals also offer multiple subspecialty services. They have a combined staff of over 500 people.

History 
The hospital has existed since 1998 in its current form, when the original hospital, founded by August Hauner in 1846 merged with the Kinderpoliklinik München (Children's Polyclinic Munich).

References

External links 
 Official site of the Kinderspital 

Buildings and structures in Munich
Ludwig Maximilian University of Munich
Children's hospitals in Germany
Hospital buildings completed in 1994
Hospitals established in 1858
Medical and health organisations based in Bavaria